Little Joy is a Brazilian/American rock supergroup formed in 2007 by Los Hermanos singer/guitarist Rodrigo Amarante, The Strokes drummer Fabrizio Moretti, and Binki Shapiro. They released their only album in 2008.

History

Formation and beginnings (2006–2008)

Amarante and Moretti met in 2006, at a festival in Lisbon where both their bands were performing, and the idea came up to start a new musical project unrelated to their respective bands. In 2007, with Los Hermanos on hiatus "for an undetermined amount of time", Amarante traveled to Los Angeles to collaborate with Devendra Banhart on his Smokey Rolls Down Thunder Canyon album. He and Moretti met during recording breaks and talked about "anything but music." Through mutual acquaintances, they met multi-instrumentalist Jordana Shapiro, who goes by "Binki," and she encouraged the pair to work on a few songs Moretti had begun writing. The band then moved into a house in the Echo Park area of Los Angeles to write more original music and record some demos. The band was christened "Little Joy" after a cocktail lounge not far from their house.

Little Joy (2008–2010) 

Their eponymous debut album was recorded with the help of producer Noah Georgeson and engineer Beau Raymond, whom Amarante met during his sessions with Devendra Banhart. It was released by Rough Trade Records on November 4, 2008, and was hailed by Pitchfork Media as "one of the sweetest, most listenable, consistently enjoyable records of the season." Their debut album was given four stars by Rolling Stone magazine and Nick Hornby voted it his favorite album of 2008.

In popular culture
Binki Shapiro contributed, alongside Little Joy collaborator Devendra Banhart, to Beck's second Record Club covers album, Songs of Leonard Cohen, as well as previously appearing in many of the music videos released from his album The Information, released in October 2006.

"The Next Time Around" was used in a television commercial for the Volkswagen Passat, while "Keep Me in Mind" was used in season one, episode twenty ("The G-Word") of the NBC comedy series Whitney. "Don’t Watch Me Dancing" was used in the film The Age of Adaline.

Binki Shapiro began her career in the performing arts at an early age. She featured as a vocalist, dancer, and actress in the Kids on Stage for a Better World, a youth performance group sponsored by the Church of Scientology Celebrity Centre International in Hollywood. They performed original productions for audiences throughout Southern California.

Band members

Little Joy
Rodrigo Amarante – vocals, guitar, bass, piano, ukulele, organ, Mellotron, percussion (2007–present)
Binki Shapiro – guitar, vocals, bass, keyboards, glockenspiel, percussion (2007–present)
Fabrizio Moretti – tenor guitar, piano, bass, drums, guitar, percussion, melodica, vocals (2007–present)

Live band
Little Joy
Rodrigo Amarante – vocals, guitar, percussion (2007–2010)
Binki Shapiro – guitar, vocals, keyboards, percussion (2007–2010)
Fabrizio Moretti – tenor guitar, guitar, percussion, vocals, drums (2007–2009)
Jack Dishel – tenor guitar, guitar, percussion, vocals (2009–2010)
Backing band
Todd Dahlhoff – bass, vocals (2008–2010)
Matt Romano – drums, percussion (2008–2010)
Matt Borg – guitar, vocals (2008–2010)
Michael Ian Cummings – guitar, vocals (2008–2010)
Noah Georgeson – guitar, vocals (2008–2010)

Discography
Little Joy (2008)

References

External links

Little Joy on Obscure Sound

Musical groups established in 2007
Rough Trade Records artists
Rock music supergroups